Westerlund 1-243 or Wd 1-243 is a luminous blue variable (LBV) star undergoing an eruptive phase located within the outskirts of the super star cluster Westerlund 1.

Observation
Westerlund 1-243 is the second brightest star in Westerlund 1, behind only Westerlund 1-4.
It is one of several different hypergiant stars in Westerlund 1.  It may also have a companion star, possibly an O-type supergiant.

Spectrum
Westerlund 1-243 displays a complex, time-varying spectrum with emission lines of hydrogen, helium and Lyman-α pumped metals, forbidden lines of nitrogen and iron, and a large number of absorption lines from neutral and singly-ionized metals. Many lines are complex emission/absorption blends, with significant spectral evolution occurring on timescales of just a few days.

Properties
Westerlund 1-243 has a temperature of ~8,500 K determined from modelling the absorption line spectrum. It is losing mass at a rate of /yr.

Evolution
Westerlund 1-243 is believed to be either in an advanced pre-red supergiant LBV phase, or has evolved through the RSG phase and returned to the blue side of the HR diagram. In the future it is expected to evolve toward a WR phase. The K-band spectrum also implies a higher temperature than that of a typical yellow hypergiant and suggests that Westerlund 1-243 may be evolving back towards a hotter state.

References 

Ara (constellation)
Luminous blue variables
A-type hypergiants